Aitkin High School (AHS) is a public high school in Aitkin, Minnesota, United States. The school serves students in grades 7–12. The school enrolls approximately 600 students per year, with 400 students in the high school and 200 attending middle school. The school is a combined middle and high school, since the town does not have the needed population of adolescents to include a separate middle school. Class sizes are around 100 students, while some classes, such as the Class of 1978, have enrolled up to 160 students at one time. The Class of 2010 is one of the smallest Aitkin High School classes in history, with a class size at graduation of 83. The class entered with 102 students in 2004. Though the more recent class of 2020 graduated with less than 70.

The school is a member of Minnesota's Independent School District 1 (Aitkin School District), and is affiliated with the Minnesota State High School League (MSHSL). The school is a member of the Mid-State Conference. The AHS mascot is the Gobbler.

History

Aitkin High School was established in the year 1894 and the oldest school building was completed in 1901. Many additions have been added to the school since. When the school was first built, many children that lived outside the city of Aitkin attended local country schools, and then attended AHS after they graduated from 8th grade. At that time, Aitkin High School served grades 9–12 only. In 1928, an addition to the school was built and it became a 7–12 school, even though many students were in country, primary and parochial schools (particularly Catholic) until 8th grade. Several modifications took place during the following decades, including a new cafeteria, band area, and auditorium. The old gym and auditorium was created in a 1941 project and the west wing was added in the 1950s. The most major change after 1928 took place in 1976, when the school was remodeled and the old school building was demolished. The west wing still remains. Not many major modifications took place after that until the year 2000, when a new band area was established. The 1941 auditorium was remodeled in 1994 while keeping most of the classic features. In 2005, a new weight room was built. The school was modified once again in 2006 with a newly added commons area, in the 9th grade locker area, and a new 7th grade locker area built on the second floor of the school, along with an LED sign in the front of the building. In 2007, a more advanced security system was installed and a speed limit regulation was implemented around the school. In 2008, a wall was removed in the cafeteria which will enable more students to have lunch in one lunch period, and signs were posted on all entrances of the school. Paintings by students were placed on the walls to give it a more friendly atmosphere. A new student parking lot was added to the school in 2009. Pavement was planned to take place in Summer 2010 but never occurred.
In circa late 2014 to early 2015, plans for remodeling the high school were considered once again. Some of the plans include an expansion of the new gym area and an addition for collaborative learning/special education program, along with a few other minor updates and modifications. The plans were voted down in a county wide election on January 6, 2015, although alternative plans are still being contemplated. Some plans include minor remodeling projects along with the possibility to building a brand new school.
Throughout the 2015–2016 school year, a few modifications were taken place throughout the high school and the athletic fields. On September 11, 2015, the Aitkin football field was named "Veterans Field" in honor of local veterans with a dedication ceremony proceeding the football game. New bleachers were added in the new gym as well as some other minor modifications. Debate is still taking place about the future of the high school, such as whether to continue modifications, build a new school, or leave the school as it is. On August 9, 2016, the public has voted against the referendum in a landslide. Starting in the 2016-2017 school years, with a grant from Apple, the school provided MacBook computers for each of the students to assist them with assignments, research, and communications. After years of debate, the first phase of major remodeling of the high school took place during the summer of 2018, which involves creation of a new special education area as well as relocation of classrooms and modifications to the library/media center.

School
In Fall 2009, AHS had 900 students.

The Aitkin School District's Superintendent is Dan Stifter. Stifter was a former Social Studies teacher in Aitkin. The high school principal is Paul Karelis, a 1980 graduate of Aitkin High School.

Curriculum and scheduling
Aitkin High School is on an 8-period quarter/semester schedule. Each semester lasts 9 weeks. Class periods are currently 46–52 minutes in length with 4 minutes passing time in between classes. Some classes, such as the ones in the Industrial Arts area are 2 periods in length. Additionally, middle school and high school students share the same time schedule. From the years 1998–2007, the school used a block schedule, where classes were 84 minutes long while middle school classes were 42–48 minutes in length with 4 minute passing time. High School students were allowed up to 7 minutes passing times. Independent study periods were added on a rotation basis. (e.g. Day 1 is 1st hour, Day 2 is second hour, etc.) Independent study periods enable students to have time to finish class assignments, get help from another teacher, attend meetings and school assemblies, and much more.  In recent years, the rotation basis has changed to a daily class period at the end of each day during Period 8.

In 2010, a new student database, Infinite Campus, was integrated to enable students, teachers, and parents to keep track of their students performance in school. The online learning tool has many feature such as the ability to register for classes online, check grades and find missing assignments.

More than 110 classes are offered. This includes subjects in agriculture, business, media arts, computer science and information technology, English, family and consumer science, art, music, physical education, industrial technology, mathematics, science, social studies, and World Languages.

Although AHS does not offer any AP or IB classes, it offers college credit for advanced classes with a program called College in the Schools through the University of Minnesota, Central Lakes Community College, Mesabi Community College, and Vermilion Community College and the option of PSEO. These enable students to receive college credits at select colleges free of tuition and book and may even obtain enough credits to get an Associate of Arts Degree.

Facilities
The school features a newly added commons area, two gyms, a band area, an auditorium, a Strength room, a choir area, and three floors of classrooms and laboratory type classroom for industrial arts, home economics, fine arts, and agriculture.

Extracurricular activities

Business Professionals of America (BPA)
Jazz Band
Knowledge Bowl
Madrigals
National Honor Society
One Act Play
Chemistry Club
Peer Helpers
Pep Band
Spanish Club
Student Council
Yearbook Production (an elective course for grades 9–12)
Student newspaper (an elective course for grades 11-12)
Occupational Foods (an elective course for grades 10–12)
Musical (as part of the Concert Choir curriculum)
Band (an elective class for grades 7–12)
Choir (an elective class for 7–12)
FFA

Athletics
Athletic teams include:

Fall
 Football
 Girls' Tennis
 Volleyball
Winter
 Boys' Basketball
 Girls' Basketball
 Wrestling
 Dance team
 Hockey
Spring
 Boys' Tennis
 Softball
 Baseball
 Golf
 Track and field

History

Aitkin High School wrestlers and dance team (known as the All Starz) have gone to state competition numerous times. The Aitkin All Starz had been known to go to state annually for more than a decade and the momentum still continues. The last time the Aitkin wrestling team went to State as a whole was in the year 2008. Aitkin High School had a great stretch of athletic ability in the 1950s, while the football, wrestling, and track team made many outstanding achievements. A lag in athletic ability took place for most of the 1960s and the 1970s with an exception for baseball and softball. The baseball team made the conference championship both in 1977 and 1978, and made it to the sections in 1977, but never made it to state throughout the decade. 1982 was a magical year for sport in Aitkin High School, which included the momentous boys' basketball state tournament in 1982 along with the progressing to state with the football team that fall. During the 1990s and 2000s, under the leadership of Dr. Edward Anderson as the Superintendent, Aitkin's athletic ability with an exception for the wrestling and the newly formed All Starz dance team has declined and its performance has shifted to mainly more artistic and academic achievements. The school has gradually transitioned into more athletic competence in the later end of the 2000s, starting when Bernie Novak has become the Superintendent in 2005, and many changes were added to the school to improve athletic competence and school spirit. In 2005, a weight room facility was constructed with the addition of newer weight room equipment in circa 2007–2008. A new scoreboard was added in 2009 in the new gym. The weight room received several upgrades in the mid 2010s as many sports refocused their efforts in the weight room. The weight room is host to a summer strength and agility program and an annual lift-a-thon, with the benefits of the lift-a-thon being donated to veterans in need.

See also 
 List of high schools in Minnesota

References

External links 

 schooltree

Public high schools in Minnesota
Educational institutions established in 1894
Schools in Aitkin County, Minnesota
Public middle schools in Minnesota
1894 establishments in Minnesota
Aitkin, Minnesota